Kuba or Quba may refer to:

Places
 Quba, capital of Quba Rayon, Azerbaijan
 Quba District (Azerbaijan)
 Kuba Kingdom, a historical Central African state
 Küba, a village in the Tibet Autonomous Region of China
 Kuba, Republic of Dagestan, a rural locality in Dagestan, Russia
 Kuba, Tibet

People
 Kuba (surname)
 Jakub Błaszczykowski, Polish footballer, nicknamed "Kuba

Other uses
 Quba Mosque, a historical mosque in Medina, Saudi Arabia
 Quba rugs and carpets

See also
 Cuba (disambiguation)
 Guba (disambiguation)
 Kuban (disambiguation)